György Selmeczi (born March 8, 1952) is a Hungarian composer, conductor, opera director, and pianist.

Biography
György Selmeczi was born in 1952 in Cluj, Romania, to Dr. János Selmecz, conductor of the Cluj Hungarian Opera, and Marcella Lokodi, a music teacher, into an ethnic Hungarian family. He emigrated to Hungary in 1976.

Works, editions and recordings
 Spiritiszták (opera) - The Spiritists
 A Szirén (opera) - The Siren
 A függő város - The Suspending City
 Bizánc (opera) - Byzantium

References

Hungarian composers
Hungarian male composers
1952 births
Musicians from Cluj-Napoca
Living people